The United States sent a delegation to 14th Pan American Games in Santo Domingo, Dominican Republic from August 1–17, 2003. At the 2003 Pan Ams, the USA garnered 270 medals: 117 gold, 80 silver and 73 bronze.

Medals

Gold

Men's Recurve Individual: Vic Wunderle
Men's Recurve Team: Guy Krueger, Glenn Meyers, and Vic Wunderle
Women's Recurve Individual: Jennifer Nichols
Women's Recurve Team: Jennifer Nichols, Stephanie Miller, and Janet Dykman

Men's 200 metres: Kenneth Brokenburr
Men's 400 metres: Mitch Potter
Men's Pole Vault: Toby Stevenson
Men's Shot Put: Reese Hoffa
Men's Decathlon: Stephen Moore
Women's 100 metres: Lauryn Williams
Women's 400m Hurdles: Joanna Hayes
Women's 4 × 100 m Relay: Angela Williams, Consuella Moore, Angela Daigle, and Lauryn Williams
Women's 4 × 400 m Relay: Me'Lisa Barber, Moushaumi Robinson, Julian Clay, and De'Hashia Trotter
Women's Pole Vault: Melissa Mueller
Women's Discus: Aretha Hill
Women's Javelin: Kim Kreiner
Women's Heptathlon: Tiffany Lott-Hogan

Men's Doubles: Howard Bach and Kevin Han

Men's Doubles: Bill Hoffman and Scott Pohl
Women's Singles: Shannon Pluhowsky

Men's Super Heavyweight (+ 91 kg): Jason Estrada

Women's K-1 500m: Ruth Nortje
Women's K-2 500m: Ruth Nortje and Kathryn Colin

Men's Mountainbike: Jeremiah Bishop
Women's Sprint: Tanya Lindenmuth
Women's Keirin: Tanya Lindenmuth
Women's Individual Road Time Trial: Kimberly Bruckner

Jumping Team: Chris Kappler, Margie Goldstein-Engle, Lauren Hough, and Beezie Madden
Dressage Team: Jan Ebeling, Pierre St. Jacques, Kristina Harrison-Naness, and Carol Lavell

Men's Foil Individual: Dan Kellner
Men's Foil Team: Jed Dupree, Dan Kellner, Soren Thompson, and Jonathan Tiomkin
Men's Sabre Individual: Ivan Lee
Men's Sabre Team: Weston Kelsey, Ivan Lee, Jason Rogers, and Adam Crompton
Women's Sabre Individual: Sada Jacobson

Men's Kumite (– 80 kg): John Fonseca

Men's Singles: Jack Huczek

Men's J/24: Tim Healy, Gordon Borges, Davenport Crocker, and Nick Judson
Women's Mistral: Lanee Butler

Women's Singles: Latasha Khan 
Women's Team: Latasha Khan, Louisa Hall, Meredeth Quick

Men's 100m Backstroke: Peter Marshall
Men's 100m Breaststroke: Mark Gangloff
Men's 200m Breaststroke: Kyle Salyards
Men's 100 m Butterfly: Ben Michaelson
Men's 200 m Butterfly: Michael Raab
Men's 400 m IM: Robert Margalis
Men's 400 m Free Relay
Men's 400 m Medley Relay
Women's 50m Freestyle: Kara Lynn Joyce
Women's 100m Freestyle: Courtney Shealy
Women's 200m Freestyle: Dana Vollmer
Women's 400m Freestyle: Elizabeth Hill
Women's 800m Freestyle: Morgan Hentzen
Women's 100m Backstroke: Diana MacManus
Women's 200m Backstroke: Jamie Reid
Women's 100m Breaststroke: Staciana Stitts
Women's 200m Breaststroke: Alexi Spann
Women's 100m Butterfly: Bethany Goodwin
Women's 400 m Free Relay
Women's 800 m Free Relay
Women's 400 m Medley Relay

Men's Team Competition: National Team
Women's Team Competition: National Team

Men's – 77 kg: Chad Vaughn
Women's – 48 kg: Tara Nott

Silver

Men's Recurve Individual: Guy Krueger

Men's 100 metres: Mardy Scales
Men's 1,500 metres: Michael Stember
Men's 110m Hurdles: Larry Wade
Men's 400m Hurdles: Eric Thomas
Men's 4 × 400 m Relay: Mitchell Potter, Ja'Warren Hooker, Adam Steele, and James Davis
Men's High Jump: Jamie Nieto
Men's Pole Vault: Russ Buller
Men's Hammer: James Parker
Women's 100 metres: Angela Williams
Women's 1,500 metres: Mary Jayne Harrelson
Women's Triple Jump: Yuliana Perez

Men's Team Competition: United States of America.

Women's Team Competition: United States
Jenni Benningfield, Rebekkah Brunson, Jamie Carey, Roneeka Hodges, Laurie Koehn, Janel McCarville, Loree Moore, Nicole Powell, Ann Strother, Lindsay Taylor, Iciss Tillis, and Barbara Turner. Head Coach: Debbie Ryan

Women's Doubles: Shannon Pluhowsky and Stacy Werth

Men's Featherweight (– 57 kg): Aaron Garcia
Men's Welterweight (– 69 kg): Juan McPherson

Men's K-2 1,000m: Benjie Lewis and Brandon Woods
Women's K-4 500m: Ruth Nortje, Sonrisa Reed, Kari-Jean McKenzie and Kathryn Colin

Men's Individual Road Time Trial: Chris Baldwin
Men's Individual Track Time Trial: Christian Stahl
Men's Keirin: Giddeon Massie
Women's Mountainbike: Mary McConneloug

Jumping Individual: Chris Kappler riding Royal Kaliber

Men's Foil Individual: Jonathan Tiomkin
Women's Épée Team: Kelley Hurley, Stephanie Eim, and Elisabeth Spilman
Women's Foil Individual: Emily Cross

Men's Kata: Clay Morton
Women's Kata: Junko Arai

Men's Doubles: Rubén González & Mike Guidry 
Women's Singles: Laura Fenton 
Women's Doubles: Jackie Rice & Kim Russell

Men's 200m Freestyle: Dan Ketchum
Men's 400m Freestyle: Fran Crippen
Men's 1500m Freestyle: Fran Crippen
Men's 200m Backstroke: Luke Wagner
Men's 100m Breaststroke: Jarrod Marrs
Men's 200m Breaststroke: Sean Quinn
Men's 400 m IM: Eric Donnelly
Women's 100m Freestyle: Christina Swindle
Women's 200m Freestyle: Colleen Lanné
Women's 400m Freestyle: Morgan Hentzen
Women's 800m Freestyle: Rachael Burke
Women's 100m Backstroke: Courtney Shealy
Women's 200m Backstroke: Diana MacManus
Women's 100m Breaststroke: Corrie Clark
Women's 200m Butterfly: Noelle Bassi
Women's 200m IM: Corrie Clark
Women's 200m IM: Kristen Caverly

Bronze

Women's Recurve Individual: Stephanie Miller

Men's 1,500 metres: Grant Robison
Men's 10,000 metres: Dan Browne
Men's 3,000m Steeple: Anthony Famiglietti
Men's High Jump: Terrance Woods
Men's Javelin: Breaux Greer
Women's 200 metres: Allyson Felix
Women's 5,000 metres: Nicole Jefferson
Women's 20 km Walk: Joanne Dow

Mixed Doubles: May Mangkalakiri and Rajiv Rai

Men's Singles: Bill Hoffman

Men's Heavyweight (– 91 kg): Devin Vargas

Men's K-1 1,000m: Rami Zur

Men's Sprint: Giddeon Massie
Men's Madison: Colby Pearce and James Carney
Women's Individual Road Time Trial: Kristin Armstrong
Women's Sprint: Chris Witty

Men's 3m Springboard: Troy Dumais
Men's 3m Synchronized Springboard: Troy Dumais and Justin Dumais
Men's 10m Synchronized Platform: Kyle Prandi and Mark Ruiz
Women's 3m Springboard Synchronized: Sara Hildebrand and Cassandra Cardinell

Jumping Individual: Margie Goldstein-Engle riding Perin

Men's Sabre Individual: Jason Rogers
Women's Foil Individual: Erinn Smart
Women's Sabre Individual: Emily Jacobson

Men's Team Competition: United States

Men's Singles: Rocky Carson

Women's Kumite (– 58 kg): Cheryl Murphy

Men's Singles: Preston Quick

Men's 50m Freestyle: Gary Hall Jr.
Men's 1500m Freestyle: Chris Thompson
Men's 100m Backstroke: Jayme Cramer
Men's 200m Backstroke: Joey Faltraco
Men's 200 m IM: Eric Donnelly
Women's 100m Butterfly: Dana Kirk
Women's 200m Butterfly: Dana Kirk
Women's 200m IM: Laura Davis

Results by event

Athletics

Track

Road

Field

Decathlon

Heptathlon

Basketball

Men's team competition
Rickey Paulding
Chris Hill
Ben Gordon
Andre Barrett
Blake Stepp
Luke Jackson
Chuck Hayes
Brandon Mouton
Arthur Johnson
Emeka Okafor
Ike Diogu
Josh Childress
Head coach: Tom Izzo

Women's Team Competition
Preliminary round
Lost to Cuba (62-84)
Defeated Canada (56-53)
Defeated Brazil (77-64)
Defeated Argentina (93-78)
Defeated Dominican Republic (109-54)
Semifinal
Defeated Brazil (75-69)
Final
Lost to Cuba (64-75) → Silver Medal
Team roster
Jenni Benningfield
Rebekkah Brunson
Jamie Carey
Roneeka Hodges
Laurie Koehn
Janel McCarville
Loree Moore
Nicole Powell
Ann Strother
Lindsay Taylor
Iciss Tillis
Barbara Turner
Head coach: Debbie Ryan

Boxing

Cycling

Mountain Bike
Jeremiah Bishop
 Men's Cross Country — 2:10.39 (→ 1st place)

Jeremy Horgan
 Men's Cross Country — did not finish (→ no ranking)

Mary McConneloug
 Women's Cross Country — + 2.50 (→ 2nd place)

Judo

Men's Competition
Alex Ottiano
Brian Olson
Chuck Jefferson
Michael Barnes
Aaron Cohen
Taylor Takata
Martin Boonzaayer

Women's Competition
Sayaka Matsumoto
Grace Jividen
Charlee Minkin
Ellen Wilson
Christina Yannetsos
Jill Collins
Nanoushka St. Pre

Swimming

Men's Competition

Women's Competition

Triathlon

Notes

See also
United States at the 2004 Summer Olympics

Nations at the 2003 Pan American Games
Pan American Games
2003